Sir James Graham, 1st Baronet  may refer to:
Sir James Graham, 1st Baronet, of Kirkstall (1753–1825), Tory MP for Cockermouth, Wigtown Burghs and Carlisle
Sir James Graham, 1st Baronet, of Netherby (1761–1824), MP for Ripon 1798-1807

See also
James Graham (disambiguation)